Dikoleps nitens is a minute species of sea snail, a marine gastropod mollusk in the family Skeneidae.

Description
The size of the shell varies between 0.4 mm and 1.4 mm.

Distribution
This species occurs in European waters and in the Mediterranean Sea.

References

 Philippi R. A., 1844: Enumeratio molluscorum Siciliae cum viventium tum in tellure tertiaria fossilium, quae in itinere suo observavit. Vol. 2 ; Eduard Anton, Halle [Halis Saxorum] iv + 303 p., pl. 13–28 
 Rubio F., Dantart L. & Luque A. (2004). El género Dikoleps (Gastropoda, Skeneidae) en las costas ibéricas. Iberus, 22(1): 113–132

External links
 

nitens
Gastropods described in 1844